There are about 830 known moth species of Ghana. The moths (mostly nocturnal) and butterflies (mostly diurnal) together make up the taxonomic order Lepidoptera.

This is a list of moth species which have been recorded in Ghana.

Anomoeotidae
Staphylinochrous euryphaea Hampson, 1920

Arctiidae
Acantharctia mundata (Walker, 1865)
Afraloa bifurca (Walker, 1855)
Afrasura discocellularis (Strand, 1912)
Afrasura indecisa (Walker, 1869)
Afrasura numida (Holland, 1893)
Afrasura obliterata (Walker, 1864)
Afrowatsonius marginalis (Walker, 1855)
Aloa moloneyi (Druce, 1887)
Alpenus affiniola (Strand, 1919)
Alpenus investigatorum (Karsch, 1898)
Alpenus maculosa (Stoll, 1781)
Alpenus nigropunctata (Bethune-Baker, 1908)
Alpenus schraderi (Rothschild, 1910)
Amata basithyris Hampson, 1914
Amata nigrobasalis Rothschild, 1910
Amerila brunnea (Hampson, 1901)
Amerila fennia (Druce, 1887)
Amerila leucoptera (Hampson, 1901)
Amerila luteibarba (Hampson, 1901)
Amerila metasarca (Hampson, 1911)
Amerila niveivitrea (Bartel, 1903)
Amerila puella (Fabricius, 1793)
Amerila roseomarginata (Rothschild, 1910)
Amerila vidua (Cramer, 1780)
Amsacta bicoloria (Gaede, 1916)
Amsacta fuscosa (Bartel, 1903)
Amsacta latimarginalis Rothschild, 1933
Amsacta marginalis Walker, 1855
Anapisa sjoestedti (Aurivillius, 1904)
Archithosia makomensis (Strand, 1912)
Argina astrea (Drury, 1773)
Asura atricraspeda Hampson, 1914
Asura distyi Kühne, 2007
Asura spurrelli (Hampson, 1914)
Automolis pallida (Hampson, 1901)
Balacra batesi Druce, 1910
Balacra caeruleifascia Walker, 1856
Balacra ehrmanni (Holland, 1893)
Balacra flavimacula Walker, 1856
Balacra furva Hampson, 1911
Balacra herona (Druce, 1887)
Balacra rubricincta Holland, 1893
Balacra rubrostriata (Aurivillius, 1892)
Binna penicillata Walker, 1865
Binna scita (Walker, 1865)
Caryatis phileta (Drury, 1782)
Ceryx semihyalina Kirby, 1896
Cragia distigmata (Hampson, 1901)
Creatonotos leucanioides Holland, 1893
Crocosia phaeocraspis Hampson, 1914
Cyana basisticta (Hampson, 1914)
Cyana delicata (Walker, 1854)
Cyana rubritermina (Bethune-Baker, 1911)
Disparctia vittata (Druce, 1898)
Dubatolovia neurophaea (Hampson, 1911)
Eilema angustipennis Strand, 1912
Eilema apicalis (Walker, 1862)
Eilema conisphora (Hampson, 1914)
Eilema proleuca (Hampson, 1914)
Epilacydes scita (Walker, 1865)
Estigmene flaviceps Hampson, 1907
Euchromia guineensis (Fabricius, 1775)
Euchromia hampsoni Seitz, 1926
Eugoa gemina Hampson, 1914
Eugoa winneba Kühne, 2007
Euproctosia cretata Hampson, 1914
Exilisia disticha (Hampson, 1914)
Logunovium nigricosta (Holland, 1893)
Melisa croceipes (Aurivillius, 1892)
Melisa diptera (Walker, 1854)
Metarctia flavicincta Aurivillius, 1900
Metarctia haematica Holland, 1893
Metarctia inconspicua Holland, 1892
Metarctia kumasina Strand, 1920
Metarctia priscilla Kiriakoff, 1957
Micralarctia punctulatum (Wallengren, 1860)
Muxta xanthopa (Holland, 1893)
Myopsyche notoplagia Hampson, 1898
Nanna eningae (Plötz, 1880)
Nanna melanosticta (Bethune-Baker, 1911)
Neuroxena flammea (Schaus, 1893)
Neuroxena medioflavus (Rothschild, 1935)
Neuroxena sulphureovitta (Strand, 1909)
Neuroxena truncatus (Rothschild, 1933)
Nyctemera acraeina Druce, 1882
Nyctemera apicalis (Walker, 1854)
Nyctemera druna (Swinhoe, 1904)
Nyctemera perspicua (Walker, 1854)
Nyctemera restrictum (Butler, 1894)
Nyctemera xanthura (Plötz, 1880)
Ovenna guineacola (Strand, 1912)
Ovenna subgriseola (Strand, 1912)
Paralpenus atripes (Hampson, 1909)
Paralpenus flavizonata (Hampson, 1911)
Paremonia argentata Hampson, 1914
Phryganopsis angulifascia (Strand, 1912)
Pseudothyretes nigrita (Kiriakoff, 1961)
Pusiola celida (Bethune-Baker, 1911)
Pusiola minutissima (Kiriakoff, 1958)
Radiarctia lutescens (Walker, 1854)
Siccia cretata Hampson, 1914
Siccia gypsia Hampson, 1914
Siccia microsticta Hampson, 1914
Siccia stictica Hampson, 1914
Spilosoma affinis Bartel, 1903
Spilosoma aurantiaca (Holland, 1893)
Spilosoma buryi (Rothschild, 1910)
Spilosoma curvilinea Walker, 1855
Spilosoma karschi Bartel, 1903
Spilosoma occidens (Rothschild, 1910)
Spilosoma pellucida (Rothschild, 1910)
Spilosoma quadrilunata (Hampson, 1901)
Spilosoma rava (Druce, 1898)
Spilosoma sulphurea Bartel, 1903
Spilosoma togoensis Bartel, 1903
Teracotona buryi Rothschild, 1910
Utetheisa pulchella (Linnaeus, 1758)
Zobida trinitas (Strand, 1912)

Copromorphidae
Rhynchoferella simplex Strand, 1915

Cossidae
Cossus fanti Hampson, 1910
Eulophonotus myrmeleon Felder, 1874
Phragmataecia sericeata Hampson, 1910
Xyleutes biatra (Hampson, 1910)

Crambidae
Aethaloessa floridalis (Zeller, 1852)
Argyractis accra (Strand, 1913)
Chalcidoptera argyrophoralis Hampson, 1912
Charltona albimixtalis Hampson, 1919
Chilo orichalcociliella (Strand, 1911)
Cirrhochrista grabczewskyi E. Hering, 1903
Conotalis aurantifascia (Hampson, 1895)
Cotachena smaragdina (Butler, 1875)
Filodes normalis Hampson, 1912
Haritalodes derogata (Fabricius, 1775)
Lamprosema pervulgalis (Hampson, 1912)
Mesolia microdontalis (Hampson, 1919)
Nausinoe geometralis (Guenée, 1854)
Obtusipalpis albidalis Hampson, 1919
Obtusipalpis fusipartalis Hampson, 1919
Orphanostigma abruptalis (Walker, 1859)
Phostria hampsonialis Schaus, 1920
Pilocrocis pterygodia Hampson, 1912
Platytes duplicilinea (Hampson, 1919)
Prionotalis peracutella Hampson, 1919
Psara brunnealis (Hampson, 1913)
Psara minoralis (Warren, 1892)
Pseudocatharylla argenticilia (Hampson, 1919)
Pseudocatharylla peralbellus (Hampson, 1919)
Pyrausta violascens Hampson, 1918
Sufetula trichophysetis Hampson, 1912
Ulopeza conigeralis Zeller, 1852

Drepanidae
Epicampoptera ivoirensis Watson, 1965
Isospidia angustipennis (Warren, 1904)
Negera bimaculata (Holland, 1893)
Negera confusa Walker, 1855
Negera disspinosa Watson, 1965
Negera natalensis (Felder, 1874)
Spidia fenestrata Butler, 1878
Uranometra oculata (Holland, 1893)

Elachistidae
Ethmia livida (Zeller, 1852)
Ethmia oculigera (Möschler, 1883)
Ptilobola inornatella (Walsingham, 1891)

Eupterotidae
Acrojana rosacea Butler, 1874
Acrojana splendida Rothschild, 1917
Hoplojana soricis Rothschild, 1917
Jana eurymas Herrich-Schäffer, 1854
Jana gracilis Walker, 1855
Jana obscura Aurivillius, 1893
Stenoglene plagiatus (Aurivillius, 1911)

Gelechiidae
Prasodryas fracticostella (Walsingham, 1891)

Geometridae
Acrostatheusis apicitincta Prout, 1915
Aletis helcita (Linnaeus, 1763)
Allochrostes impunctata (Warren, 1897)
Antharmostes interalbicans Warren, 1902
Aphilopota cardinalli Prout, 1954
Aphilopota statuta Prout, 1954
Cartaletis gracilis (Möschler, 1887)
Chiasmia albivia (Prout, 1915)
Chiasmia feraliata (Guenée, 1858)
Chiasmia impar (Warren, 1897)
Chiasmia majestica (Warren, 1901)
Coenina aurivena Butler, 1898
Comostolopsis stillata (Felder & Rogenhofer, 1875)
Cyclophora sublunata (Swinhoe, 1904)
Epicosymbia chrysoparalias (Prout, 1917)
Epigynopteryx ansorgei (Warren, 1901)
Ereunetea flava Warren, 1909
Gelasmodes fasciata (Warren, 1899)
Geodena partita Swinhoe, 1904
Geodena surrendra Swinhoe, 1904
Heterostegane monilifera Prout, 1915
Idaea prucholoma (Prout, 1932)
Isturgia catalaunaria (Guenée, 1858)
Lophostola cara Prout, 1913
Malgassapeira mixtilinea (Warren, 1909)
Melinoessa aemonia (Swinhoe, 1904)
Melinoessa aureola Prout, 1934
Mixocera albimargo Warren, 1901
Narthecusa tenuiorata Walker, 1862
Oedicentra gerydaria Swinhoe, 1904
Pitthea continua Walker, 1854
Prasinocyma hadrata (Felder & Rogenhofer, 1875)
Prasinocyma niveisticta Prout, 1912
Prasinocyma rhodocycla Prout, 1917
Prasinocyma rugistrigula Prout, 1912
Racotis squalida (Butler, 1878)
Scopula minorata (Boisduval, 1833)
Somatina accraria Swinhoe, 1904
Somatina apicipuncta Prout, 1915
Somatina chalyboeata (Walker, 1869)
Syncollesis coerulea (Warren, 1896)
Terina doleris (Plötz, 1880)
Thetidia undulilinea (Warren, 1905)
Xenimpia erosa Warren, 1895
Xenimpia sillaria (Swinhoe, 1904)
Xylopteryx nacaria (Swinhoe, 1904)
Zamarada acrochra Prout, 1928
Zamarada adumbrata D. S. Fletcher, 1974
Zamarada anacantha D. S. Fletcher, 1974
Zamarada bicuspida D. S. Fletcher, 1974
Zamarada corroborata Herbulot, 1954
Zamarada crystallophana Mabille, 1900
Zamarada cucharita D. S. Fletcher, 1974
Zamarada cydippe Herbulot, 1954
Zamarada dentigera Warren, 1909
Zamarada dilucida Warren, 1909
Zamarada dolorosa D. S. Fletcher, 1974
Zamarada dyscapna D. S. Fletcher, 1974
Zamarada eucharis (Drury, 1782)
Zamarada euerces Prout, 1928
Zamarada euphrosyne Oberthür, 1912
Zamarada flavicosta Warren, 1897
Zamarada ignicosta Prout, 1912
Zamarada indicata D. S. Fletcher, 1974
Zamarada leona Gaede, 1915
Zamarada lepta D. S. Fletcher, 1974
Zamarada melanopyga Herbulot, 1954
Zamarada melpomene Oberthür, 1912
Zamarada mimesis D. S. Fletcher, 1974
Zamarada nasuta Warren, 1897
Zamarada paxilla D. S. Fletcher, 1974
Zamarada perlepidata (Walker, 1863)
Zamarada protrusa Warren, 1897
Zamarada reflexaria (Walker, 1863)
Zamarada regularis D. S. Fletcher, 1974
Zamarada vigilans Prout, 1915
Zamarada vulpina Warren, 1897

Gracillariidae
Caloptilia pseudoaurita Triberti, 1989
Stomphastis thraustica (Meyrick, 1908)

Lasiocampidae
Euphorea ondulosa (Conte, 1909)
Filiola dogma Zolotuhin & Gurkovich, 2009
Filiola fulgurata (Aurivillius, 1909)
Gastroplakaeis delicatulus Aurivillius, 1911
Gastroplakaeis forficulatus (Möschler, 1887)
Gonometa imperialis Aurivillius, 1915
Grellada imitans (Aurivillius, 1893)
Leipoxais dives Aurivillius, 1915
Leipoxais humfreyi Aurivillius, 1915
Leipoxais manica Hering, 1928
Leipoxais proboscidea (Guérin-Méneville, 1832)
Odontocheilopteryx haribda Gurkovich & Zolotuhin, 2009
Odontocheilopteryx pattersoni Tams, 1926
Odontocheilopteryx phoneus Hering, 1928
Odontogama nigricans Aurivillius, 1914
Opisthodontia spodopasta Tams, 1931
Pachymeta immunda (Holland, 1893)
Pachymetana guttata (Aurivillius, 1914)
Pachyna subfascia (Walker, 1855)
Pachytrina elygara Zolotuhin & Gurkovich, 2009
Pachytrina honrathii (Dewitz, 1881)
Pallastica lateritia (Hering, 1928)
Pallastica pallens (Bethune-Baker, 1908)
Philotherma jacchus Möschler, 1887
Pseudometa choba (Druce, 1899)
Pseudometa pagetodes Tams, 1929
Sena cardinalli (Tams, 1931)
Stoermeriana sjostedti (Aurivillius, 1902)
Theophasida cardinalli (Tams, 1926)
Theophasida serafim Zolotuhin & Prozorov, 2010
Trabala burchardii (Dewitz, 1881)

Limacodidae
Altha rubrifusalis Hampson, 1910
Casphalia elegans Jordan, 1915
Ctenolita argyrobapta Karsch, 1899
Hadraphe aprica Karsch, 1899
Hyphorma subterminalis Hampson, 1910
Latoia albilinea (Hampson, 1910)
Macroplectra bilineata West, 1940
Macroplectra fuscifusa Hampson, 1910
Miresa gilba Karsch, 1899
Narosa irrorata West, 1940
Niphadolepis lampra Hering, 1933
Niphadolepis schultzei Hering, 1932
Parapluda syngrapha (Hampson, 1910)
Parasa divisa West, 1940
Parasa mesochloris Hampson, 1910
Perola cardinalli (West, 1940)
Semyrilla lineata (Holland, 1893)
Sporetolepis argyrolepia (Hampson, 1910)
Susica molybdea Hampson, 1910
Zinara recurvata Hampson, 1910

Lymantriidae
Bracharoa mixta (Snellen, 1872)
Conigephyra unipunctata (Möschler, 1887)
Cropera testacea Walker, 1855
Crorema mentiens Walker, 1855
Crorema ochracea (Snellen, 1872)
Dasychira bergmannii (Swinhoe, 1904)
Dasychira endophaea Hampson, 1910
Dasychira goodii (Holland, 1893)
Dasychira hieroglyphica (Swinhoe, 1904)
Dasychira libella Swinhoe, 1904
Dasychira punctifera (Walker, 1857)
Dasychira sordida Möschler, 1887
Dasychira sphaleroides Hering, 1926
Dasychira stegmanni Grünberg, 1910
Dasychira subflava (Walker, 1855)
Eudasychira dina (Hering, 1926)
Eudasychira quinquepunctata Möschler, 1887
Euproctis cryphia Collenette, 1960
Euproctis fumitincta Hampson, 1910
Euproctis lepidographa Hampson, 1910
Euproctis melanopholis Hampson, 1910
Euproctis pygmaea (Walker, 1855)
Euproctis rufiterga Hampson, 1910
Euproctoides acrisia Plötz, 1880
Griveaudyria ila (Swinhoe, 1904)
Heteronygmia chismona Swinhoe, 1903
Heteronygmia manicata (Aurivillius, 1892)
Laelia atrisquamata Hampson, 1910
Laelia fracta Schaus & Clements, 1893
Laelia gigantea Hampson, 1910
Laelia pheosia (Hampson, 1910)
Laelia pulcherrima (Hering, 1926)
Leucoma ogovensis (Holland, 1893)
Leucoma parva (Plötz, 1880)
Lomadonta obscura Swinhoe, 1904
Lomadonta ochriaria Hampson, 1910
Marblepsis flabellaria (Fabricius, 1787)
Mylantria xanthospila (Plötz, 1880)
Naroma signifera Walker, 1856
Naroma varipes (Walker, 1865)
Neomardara africana (Holland, 1893)
Opoboa chrysoparala Collenette, 1932
Otroeda hesperia (Cramer, 1779)
Otroeda nerina (Drury, 1780)
Otroeda planax (Drury, 1780)
Paqueta chloroscia (Hering, 1926)
Pseudonotodonta virescens (Möschler, 1887)
Stracena fuscivena Swinhoe, 1903
Stracena promelaena (Holland, 1893)

Metarbelidae
Haberlandia otfriedi Lehmann, 2011
Haberlandia rohdei Lehmann, 2011
Metarbela cremorna Hampson, 1920
Metarbela laguna Hampson, 1920
Moyencharia ochreicosta (Gaede, 1929)
Ortharbela diagonalis (Hampson, 1910)
Salagena fuscata Gaede, 1929

Noctuidae
Aburina leucocharagma Hampson, 1926
Aburina phoenocrosmena Hampson, 1926
Achaea boris (Geyer, 1837)
Achaea catocaloides Guenée, 1852
Achaea ezea (Cramer, 1779)
Achaea faber Holland, 1894
Achaea indicabilis Walker, 1858
Achaea jamesoni L. B. Prout, 1919
Achaea lienardi (Boisduval, 1833)
Achaea mercatoria (Fabricius, 1775)
Achaea mormoides Walker, 1858
Achaea occidens (Hampson, 1913)
Acontia citrelinea Bethune-Baker, 1911
Acontia gratiosa Wallengren, 1856
Acontia hampsoni Hacker, Legrain & Fibiger, 2008
Acontia hemiselenias (Hampson, 1918)
Acontia imitatrix Wallengren, 1856
Acontia insocia (Walker, 1857)
Acontia nigrimacula Hacker, Legrain & Fibiger, 2008
Acontia porphyrea (Butler, 1898)
Acontia transfigurata Wallengren, 1856
Acontia veroxanthia Hacker, Legrain & Fibiger, 2010
Acontia wahlbergi Wallengren, 1856
Aegocera rectilinea Boisduval, 1836
Aegocera tigrina (Druce, 1882)
Amyna punctum (Fabricius, 1794)
Andobana multipunctata (Druce, 1899)
Androlymnia torsivena (Hampson, 1902)
Anigraea purpurascens Hampson, 1912
Anoba glyphica (Bethune-Baker, 1911)
Anoba sinuata (Fabricius, 1775)
Anomis endochlora Hampson, 1926
Antarchaea signifera Hampson, 1926
Anticarsia albilineata Hampson, 1926
Argyrogramma signata (Fabricius, 1775)
Asota speciosa (Drury, 1773)
Athyrma discimacula Hampson, 1926
Audea endophaea Hampson, 1913
Audea kathrina Kühne, 2005
Audea paulumnodosa Kühne, 2005
Avitta atripuncta Hampson, 1926
Baniopis pulverea Hampson, 1926
Belciana euchlora Hampson, 1926
Blasticorhinus trichopoda Hampson, 1926
Brevipecten politzari Hacker & Fibiger, 2007
Calligraphidia opulenta (Möschler, 1887)
Callixena versicolora Saalmüller, 1891
Caryonopera conifera Hampson, 1926
Catephia cryptodisca Hampson, 1926
Catephia dipterygia Hampson, 1926
Catephia endoplaga Hampson, 1926
Cautatha phoenicea Hampson, 1910
Cerynea flavibasalis Hampson, 1910
Cerynea trichobasis Hampson, 1910
Colbusa euclidica Walker, 1865
Corgatha enispodes Hampson, 1910
Corgatha macariodes Hampson, 1910
Corgatha ozolica Hampson, 1910
Corgatha regula Gaede, 1916
Crameria amabilis (Drury, 1773)
Crypsotidia mesosema Hampson, 1913
Crypsotidia remanei Wiltshire, 1977
Cyligramma amblyops Mabille, 1891
Cyligramma latona (Cramer, 1775)
Digama budonga Bethune-Baker, 1913
Digama costimacula Swinhoe, 1907
Drepanophiletis castaneata Hampson, 1926
Dysgonia conjunctura (Walker, 1858)
Dysgonia derogans (Walker, 1858)
Dysgonia palpalis (Walker, 1865)
Dysgonia pudica (Möschler, 1887)
Dysgonia rectivia (Hampson, 1913)
Dysgonia torrida (Guenée, 1852)
Egnasia microsema Hampson, 1926
Enispa albicosta Hampson, 1910
Enispa atriceps Hampson, 1910
Enmonodiops ochrodiscata Hampson, 1926
Ercheia subsignata (Walker, 1865)
Erebus walkeri (Butler, 1875)
Eublemma albicosta Hampson, 1910
Eublemma albifascia Hampson, 1910
Eublemma anachoresis (Wallengren, 1863)
Eublemma atrifusa Hampson, 1910
Eublemma aurantiaca Hampson, 1910
Eublemma cochylioides (Guenée, 1852)
Eublemma exigua (Walker, 1858)
Eublemma ragusana (Freyer, 1844)
Eublemma scitula (Rambur, 1833)
Eudrapa metathermeola Hampson, 1926
Eudrapa mollis Walker, 1857
Euippodes euprepes Hampson, 1926
Euminucia conflua Hampson, 1913
Euminucia orthogona Hampson, 1913
Eutelia distorta Hampson, 1912
Eutelia poliochroa Hampson, 1912
Eutelia subrubens (Mabille, 1890)
Eutelia symphonica Hampson, 1902
Exophyla melanocleis Hampson, 1926
Feliniopsis africana (Schaus & Clements, 1893)
Feliniopsis grisea (Laporte, 1973)
Feliniopsis gueneei (Laporte, 1973)
Feliniopsis hosplitoides (Laporte, 1979)
Feliniopsis laportei Hacker & Fibiger, 2007
Feliniopsis nigribarbata (Hampson, 1908)
Focillopis eclipsia Hampson, 1926
Gonelydna acutangula Hampson, 1910
Gonioscia meroleuca Hampson, 1926
Haemaphlebia atripalpis Hampson, 1910
Hamodes simplicia Weymer, 1892
Helicoverpa assulta (Guenée, 1852)
Heliophisma catocalina Holland, 1894
Heliophisma klugii (Boisduval, 1833)
Heraclia aemulatrix (Westwood, 1881)
Heraclia longipennis (Walker, 1854)
Heraclia medeba (Druce, 1880)
Heraclia pallida (Walker, 1854)
Herpeperas atrapex Hampson, 1926
Hollandia spurrelli Hampson, 1926
Holocryptis albida Hampson, 1918
Hypena obacerralis Walker, [1859]
Hypopyra capensis Herrich-Schäffer, 1854
Hypotacha ochribasalis (Hampson, 1896)
Iambiodes incerta (Rothschild, 1913)
Isadelphina lacteifascia Hampson, 1926
Leucania metasarca (Hampson, 1907)
Libystica crenata Hampson, 1926
Lobophyllodes miniatus (Grünberg, 1907)
Lophiophora fulminans Bryk, 1915
Lophodaxa labandina Hampson, 1926
Lophoptera litigiosa (Boisduval, 1833)
Lophoruza semiscripta (Mabille, 1893)
Loxioda alternans Hampson, 1926
Marathyssa cuneata (Saalmüller, 1891)
Marcipa amaba Hampson, 1926
Marcipa argyrosema Hampson, 1926
Marcipa disrupta Hampson, 1926
Marcipa endoselene Hampson, 1926
Marcipa magniplaga Hampson, 1926
Marcipa monosema Hampson, 1926
Marcipa ruptisigna Hampson, 1926
Marcipalina confluens (Hampson, 1926)
Marcipalina melanoconia (Hampson, 1926)
Masalia albiseriata (Druce, 1903)
Masalia bimaculata (Moore, 1888)
Masalia decorata (Moore, 1881)
Masalia flaviceps (Hampson, 1903)
Masalia flavistrigata (Hampson, 1903)
Masalia galatheae (Wallengren, 1856)
Masalia nubila (Hampson, 1903)
Masalia rubristria (Hampson, 1903)
Massaga hesparia (Cramer, 1775)
Massaga maritona Butler, 1868
Massaga noncoba Kiriakoff, 1974
Maxera euryptera Hampson, 1926
Mazuca haemagrapha Hampson, 1910
Mecodina apicia Hampson, 1926
Mecodina nigripuncta Hampson, 1926
Mecodopsis conisema Hampson, 1926
Mesosciera typica Hampson, 1926
Metagarista maenas (Herrich-Schäffer, 1853)
Metagarista triphaenoides Walker, 1854
Micraxylia nyei Berio, 1964
Mimasura miltochristodes Hampson, 1918
Miniodes discolor Guenée, 1852
Miniodes phaeosoma Hampson, 1913
Mitrophrys magna (Walker, 1854)
Mocis mayeri (Boisduval, 1833)
Mocis proverai Zilli, 2000
Mythimna languida (Walker, 1858)
Nagia homotona Hampson, 1926
Nagia microsema Hampson, 1926
Nagia monosema Hampson, 1926
Oglasa annulisigna Hampson, 1926
Oglasa atristipata Hampson, 1926
Oglasa aulota Hampson, 1926
Oglasa diagonalis Hampson, 1926
Oglasa griselda Hampson, 1926
Oglasa microsema Hampson, 1926
Oglasa parallela Hampson, 1926
Oglasa phaeonephele Hampson, 1926
Oglasodes atrisignata Hampson, 1926
Oglasodes bisinuata Hampson, 1926
Ogovia aliena (Holland, 1920)
Oligia hypothermes Hampson, 1908
Ophiusa conspicienda (Walker, 1858)
Ophiusa recurvata (Hampson, 1913)
Ophiusa subdiversa (L. B. Prout, 1919)
Oraesia cerne (Fawcett, 1916)
Oruza divisa (Walker, 1862)
Ozarba domina (Holland, 1894)
Ozarba ochrozona Hampson, 1910
Pangrapta elassa Hampson, 1926
Paralephana flavilinea Hampson, 1926
Paralephana incurvata Hampson, 1926
Paralephana monogona Hampson, 1926
Paralephana nigripalpis Hampson, 1926
Paralephana obliqua Hampson, 1926
Paralephana sarcochroa Hampson, 1926
Parallelura palumbiodes (Hampson, 1902)
Pericyma mendax (Walker, 1858)
Phaegorista leucomelas (Herrich-Schäffer, 1855)
Phaegorista similis Walker, 1869
Platyscia mesoscia Hampson, 1926
Plusia microstigma Hampson, 1910
Plusiodonta ionochrota Hampson, 1926
Plusiophaes scotaea (Hampson, 1926)
Polygrapta argyropasta Hampson, 1926
Polytelodes florifera (Walker, 1858)
Prolymnia viola Hampson, 1911
Pseudoarcte melanis (Mabille, 1890)
Pseudogiria hypographa (Hampson, 1926)
Pseudomicrodes polysticta Hampson, 1910
Rhynchina leucodonta Hampson, 1910
Rivula erebina Hampson, 1926
Rougeotiana xanthoperas (Hampson, 1926)
Sarothroceras banaka (Plötz, 1880)
Schausia gladiatoria (Holland, 1893)
Simplicia extinctalis (Zeller, 1852)
Spodoptera exempta (Walker, 1857)
Spodoptera exigua (Hübner, 1808)
Strongylosia semiflava Hampson, 1926
Sypnoides equatorialis (Holland, 1894)
Taviodes discomma Hampson, 1926
Thiacidas berenice (Fawcett, 1916)
Thiacidas schausi (Hampson, 1905)
Thiacidas stassarti Hacker & Zilli, 2007
Thyas metaphaea (Hampson, 1913)
Thyas parallelipipeda (Guenée, 1852)
Thyas rubricata (Holland, 1894)
Toana craspedica Hampson, 1910
Tolna macrosema Hampson, 1913
Tolna sypnoides (Butler, 1878)
Trachea euryscia Hampson, 1918
Trichoplusia orichalcea (Fabricius, 1775)
Trigonodes hyppasia (Cramer, 1779)
Tuerta chrysochlora Walker, 1869
Ugiodes cinerea Hampson, 1926
Zethesides pusilla Hampson, 1926

Nolidae
Aiteta paralella Hampson, 1912
Bryophilopsis anomoiota (Bethune-Baker, 1911)
Bryophilopsis cometes Hampson, 1912
Chlorozada endophaea Hampson, 1912
Chlorozada pyrites Hampson, 1912
Earias ogovana Holland, 1893
Giaura plumbeofusa Hampson, 1920
Gigantoceras rectilinea Hampson, 1912
Gigantoceras solstitialis Holland, 1893
Iscadia glaucograpta (Hampson, 1912)
Leocyma camilla (Druce, 1887)
Leocyma discophora Hampson, 1912
Lophocrama phoenicochlora Hampson, 1912
Metaleptina albibasis Holland, 1893
Metaleptina obliterata Holland, 1893
Microzada anaemica Hampson, 1912
Negeta mesoleuca (Holland, 1894)
Negeta molybdota Hampson, 1912
Negeta purpurascens Hampson, 1912
Negeta semialba Hampson, 1918
Neonegeta atriflava Hampson, 1912
Neonegeta pollusca (Schaus, 1893)
Neonegeta purpurea Hampson, 1912
Nola apicalis (Hampson, 1903)
Nola argyropasta (Hampson, 1914)
Nola chionea Hampson, 1911
Nola cretaceoides Poole, 1989
Nola endoscota Hampson, 1914
Nola foviferoides Poole, 1989
Nola melalopha (Hampson, 1900)
Nola melanoscelis (Hampson, 1914)
Nola mesonephele (Hampson, 1914)
Nola mesothermoides Poole, 1989
Nola microlopha (Hampson, 1900)
Nola phaeocraspis (Hampson, 1909)
Nola tornalis (Hampson, 1914)
Odontestis cyphonota Hampson, 1912
Odontestis prosticta (Holland, 1894)
Pardasena lativia Hampson, 1912
Pardoxia graellsii (Feisthamel, 1837)
Periplusia nubilicosta Holland, 1894
Petrinia lignosa Walker, 1869
Selepa cumasia Hampson, 1912
Westermannia cuprea Hampson, 1905

Notodontidae
Afropteryx angulata (Gaede, 1928)
Amphiphalera leuconephra Hampson, 1910
Andocidia tabernaria Kiriakoff, 1958
Antheua amphiaraus (Kiriakoff, 1955)
Antheua delicata Bethune-Baker, 1911
Antheua elongata Gaede, 1928
Antheua extenuata Walker, 1869
Antheua ruficosta (Hampson, 1910)
Antheua trifasciata (Hampson, 1909)
Antheua vittata (Walker, 1855)
Arciera nigripuncta (Rothschild, 1917)
Arciera sexpunctata Kiriakoff, 1979
Bisolita minuta (Holland, 1893)
Brachychira excellens (Rothschild, 1917)
Catarctia terminipuncta Hampson, 1910
Daulopaectes trichosa (Hampson, 1910)
Desmeocraera aquamarina Kiriakoff, 1958
Desmeocraera bitioides (Holland, 1893)
Desmeocraera confluens Gaede, 1928
Desmeocraera leucophaea Gaede, 1928
Desmeocraera sagittata Gaede, 1928
Desmeocraera sincera Kiriakoff, 1958
Desmeocraerula pallida Kiriakoff, 1963
Enomotarcha chloana (Holland, 1893)
Epanaphe parva (Aurivillius, 1891)
Epicerura pulverulenta (Hampson, 1910)
Eurystauridia triangularis (Gaede, 1928)
Lamoriodes metaphaea Hampson, 1910
Macronadata collaris Möschler, 1887
Odontoperas aureomixta Kiriakoff, 1959
Paradiastema pulverea Hampson, 1910
Polienus rubritincta (Hampson, 1910)
Psalisodes leuca (Hampson, 1910)
Scalmicauda evadne Kiriakoff, 1979
Scalmicauda melasema Kiriakoff, 1959
Scalmicauda molestula Kiriakoff, 1959
Scalmicauda terminalis Kiriakoff, 1959
Scrancia atrifasciata Gaede, 1928
Scrancia lactea Gaede, 1928
Scranciola habilis Kiriakoff, 1965
Synete argentescens (Hampson, 1910)
Synete subarcuata Kiriakoff, 1979
Trabanta rufisquamata (Hampson, 1910)
Xanthodonta isabellina Kiriakoff, 1979
Xanthodonta minima (Hampson, 1910)

Psychidae
Eumeta cervina Druce, 1887
Eumeta rougeoti Bourgogne, 1955

Pterophoridae
Pterophorus ashanti Arenberger, 1995
Pterophorus candidalis (Walker, 1864)
Pterophorus spissa (Bigot, 1969)
Walsinghamiella eques (Walsingham, 1891)
Xyroptila africana Bigot, 1969

Pyralidae
Eldana saccharina Walker, 1865
Ematheudes straminella Snellen, 1872
Endotricha consobrinalis Zeller, 1852
Endotricha vinolentalis Ragonot, 1891
Gauna pyralodes (Hampson, 1916)
Lepidogma melanospila Hampson, 1916
Macalla olivaris Hampson, 1916
Perula apicalis (Hampson, 1916)
Rhynchopaschia virescens Hampson, 1916
Triphassa flavifrons (Warren, 1892)

Saturniidae
Aurivillius arata (Westwood, 1849)
Bunaeopsis macrophthalma (Kirby, 1881)
Carnegia mirabilis (Aurivillius, 1895)
Epiphora albidus (Druce, 1886)
Epiphora lineata (Bouvier, 1930)
Epiphora vacuna (Westwood, 1849)
Gonimbrasia occidentalis Rothschild, 1907
Goodia hierax Jordan, 1922
Holocerina angulata (Aurivillius, 1893)
Lobobunaea melanoneura (Rothschild, 1907)
Lobobunaea phaedusa (Drury, 1782)
Ludia obscura Aurivillius, 1893
Micragone nubifera Bouvier, 1936
Nudaurelia dione (Fabricius, 1793)
Nudaurelia eblis Strecker, 1876
Nudaurelia emini (Butler, 1888)
Nudaurelia xanthomma (Rothschild, 1907)
Orthogonioptilum brunneum Jordan, 1922
Orthogonioptilum deletum Jordan, 1922
Orthogonioptilum prox Karsch, 1892
Orthogonioptilum vestigiata (Holland, 1893)
Pseudantheraea discrepans (Butler, 1878)

Sesiidae
Barbasphecia ares Pühringer & Sáfián, 2011
Barbasphecia hephaistos Pühringer & Sáfián, 2011
Episannina albifrons (Hampson, 1910)
Episannina flavicincta Hampson, 1919
Melittia chalconota Hampson, 1910
Sphecosesia brachyptera Hampson, 1919
Synanthedon auripes (Hampson, 1910)
Synanthedon exochiformis (Walker, 1856)
Synanthedon flavipectus (Hampson, 1910)

Sphingidae
Antinephele anomala (Butler, 1882)
Antinephele muscosa Holland, 1889
Chloroclanis virescens (Butler, 1882)
Falcatula cymatodes (Rothschild & Jordan, 1912)
Hippotion aporodes Rothschild & Jordan, 1912
Hypaedalea butleri Rothschild, 1894
Leucophlebia afra Karsch, 1891
Lophostethus dumolinii (Angas, 1849)
Neopolyptychus ancylus (Rothschild & Jordan, 1916)
Neopolyptychus spurrelli (Rothschild & Jordan, 1912)
Nephele discifera Karsch, 1891
Nephele peneus (Cramer, 1776)
Phylloxiphia bicolor (Rothschild, 1894)
Phylloxiphia illustris (Rothschild & Jordan, 1906)
Platysphinx constrigilis (Walker, 1869)
Platysphinx phyllis Rothschild & Jordan, 1903
Platysphinx stigmatica (Mabille, 1878)
Platysphinx vicaria Jordan, 1920
Polyptychus andosa Walker, 1856
Polyptychus carteri (Butler, 1882)
Polyptychus hollandi Rothschild & Jordan, 1903
Polyptychus lapidatus Joicey & Kaye, 1917
Polyptychus murinus Rothschild, 1904
Polyptychus orthographus Rothschild & Jordan, 1903
Polyptychus paupercula (Holland, 1889)
Polyptychus retusus Rothschild & Jordan, 1908
Pseudopolyptychus foliaceus (Rothschild & Jordan, 1903)
Temnora iapygoides (Holland, 1889)
Theretra jugurtha (Boisduval, 1875)
Theretra perkeo Rothschild & Jordan, 1903

Thyrididae
Banisia fuliginea (Whalley, 1971)
Banisia inoptata (Whalley, 1971)
Byblisia setipes (Plötz, 1880)
Cecidothyris chrysotherma (Hampson, 1914)
Cecidothyris tyrannica Whalley, 1971
Dysodia vitrina (Boisduval, 1829)
Epaena candida Whalley, 1971
Heteroschista nigranalis Warren, 1903
Marmax hyparchus (Cramer, 1779)
Marmax vicaria (Walker, 1854)
Nemea eugrapha (Hampson, 1906)
Ninia plumipes (Drury, 1782)
Opula perigrapha (Hampson, 1914)
Rhodoneura sordidula (Plötz, 1880)
Striglina clathrata (Hampson, 1897)

Tineidae
Acridotarsa melipecta (Meyrick, 1915)
Afrocelestis sacculata Gozmány, 1968
Ceratophaga vastellus (Zeller, 1852)
Cimitra fetialis (Meyrick, 1917)
Edosa endroedyi (Gozmány, 1966)
Erechthias travestita (Gozmány, 1968)
Hyperbola pastoralis (Meyrick, 1931)
Monopis addenda Gozmány, 1965
Monopis immaculata Gozmány, 1967
Monopis megalodelta Meyrick, 1908
Monopis ministrans Gozmány, 1968
Monopis rejectella (Walker, 1864)
Morophaga soror Gozmány, 1965
Organodesma leucomicra (Gozmány, 1966)
Perissomastix sericea Gozmány, 1966
Perissomastix stibarodes (Meyrick, 1908)
Perissomastix styx Gozmány, 1966
Phereoeca praecox Gozmány & Vári, 1973
Phereoeca proletaria (Meyrick, 1921)
Phthoropoea oenochares (Meyrick, 1920)
Silosca licziae Gozmány, 1967
Sphallestasis spinifurca (Gozmány, 1969)
Syncalipsis optania (Meyrick, 1908)
Syncalipsis scotochrysis Gozmány, 1969
Syncalipsis typhodes (Meyrick, 1917)
Tiquadra cultrifera Meyrick, 1914
Tiquadra goochii Walsingham, 1881

Tortricidae
Accra viridis (Walsingham, 1891)
Afroploce karsholti Aarvik, 2004
Bactra aletha Diakonoff, 1963
Coccothera ferrifracta Diakonoff, 1968
Cydia taocosma (Meyrick, 1914)
Eccopsis incultana (Walker, 1863)
Eccopsis wahlbergiana Zeller, 1852
Eupoecilia aburica Razowski, 1993
Olethreutes molybdachtha (Meyrick, 1930)
Tortrix dinota Meyrick, 1918
Xeneboda kumasiana Razowski & Tuck, 2000

Uraniidae
Acropteris costinigrata Warren, 1897

Xyloryctidae
Eretmocera scatospila Zeller, 1852

References

External links 
 

Ghana
Moths
Ghana
Ghana